Cornelius Michael 'Nelie' Smith  (8 May 1934 – 2 May 2016) was a South African rugby union player and coach.

Playing career

Smith made his provincial debut at scrumhalf for Orange Free State during the 1956 season and went on to play 60 matches for Orange Free State, captaining them 37 times. He also played four matches for Griqualand West.

He made his test debut for the Springboks during the Australian rugby tour of 1963 in the third test on 24 August 1963 at the Ellis Park in Johannesburg. South Africa lost the match 9–11, with Smith scoring all nine points. Smith scored twelve points in seven test matches for South Africa and captained the team in four tests. He also played in twelve tour matches and scored a further nine points for the Springboks.

Test history

Coaching career

Smith coached numerous teams, both in South Africa and internationally. His first big success as a coach was in 1976, when he and Sakkie van Zyl, coached the Orange Free State to its first Currie Cup title. He was the Springboks coach in 1980 when the Springboks defeated Billy Beaumont's Lions and in 1981 he was the coach during the Springbok tour of New Zealand and the United States.

In 1985, Smith was approached by the Italian club Rugby Rovigo, which in a 2 years window he contributed in re-establishing as one of the strongest Italian sides. Forging a scrum culture, then contributing in signing fellow South Africans Tito Lupini, Naas Botha and Gert Smal, Smith was capable to gain Rugby Rovigo his 10th national championship in 1988, reaching a back to back final in 1989. His impact in putting a 9 years drought to an end is still a milestone in Rugby Rovigo history, the most rugby-addicted city in Italy.

See also

List of South Africa national rugby union players – Springbok no. 389

References

1934 births
2016 deaths
South African rugby union coaches
South African rugby union players
South Africa international rugby union players
Free State Cheetahs players
Rugby union players from Bloemfontein
Rugby union scrum-halves